Suleidy Suarez (born 8 July 1991) is a Dominican team handball player. She plays for the club Ortiz Celado, and on the Dominican Republic national team. She competed at the 2013 World Women's Handball Championship in Serbia, where the Dominican Republic placed 23rd.

References

1991 births
Living people
Dominican Republic female handball players
Pan American Games medalists in handball
Pan American Games bronze medalists for the Dominican Republic
Handball players at the 2007 Pan American Games
Handball players at the 2011 Pan American Games
Handball players at the 2019 Pan American Games
Central American and Caribbean Games gold medalists for the Dominican Republic
Competitors at the 2018 Central American and Caribbean Games
Central American and Caribbean Games medalists in handball
Medalists at the 2011 Pan American Games